Fikremariam (unknown - 1937) was an Ethiopian commander and a patriot.

Biography
Fikremariam was from Menz, an Amhara region of Shewa Province.

In 1930, during Gugsa Welle's Rebellion, Fitawrari Fikremariam fought on the side of Negus  Tafari Makonnen.  On 31 March, during the Battle of Anchem, Fikremariam commanded the left wing of the Imperial Army.  The men in his command were from Wollo Province.

In 1936, during the Second Italo-Ethiopian War, Fitawrari Fikremariam commanded the Guard of Crown Prince Asfaw Wossen Tafari in Dessie.  In addition, he commanded the Shewan garrison.  But, when Emperor Haile Selassie and what was left of the retreating Imperial Army approached Dessie after the Battle of Maychew, they were told that the Eritreans had already occupied the city.  In addition, the Emperor was told that, on 14 April, the Crown Prince had fled without a shot being fired.

From about May 1936 to about October 1937, during the Italian occupation of Ethiopia, Fikremariam fought as an Arbegnoch until his death.

See also
 Ethiopian aristocratic and court titles
 Ethiopian Order of Battle Second Italo-Abyssinian War

Notes 
Footnotes

Citations

References
 
 
 

Ethiopian military personnel
Year of birth uncertain
1937 deaths